Tin Bazar is a highly populated residential and semi-industrial area in the eastern part in the city of Serampore, West Bengal.

See also 
 Danish India
 Serampore
 St. Olav's Church, Serampore

References 

Serampore
Neighbourhoods in West Bengal